Tolerance or toleration is the state of tolerating, or putting up with, conditionally.

Economics, business, and politics
 Toleration Party, a historic political party active in Connecticut
 Tolerant Systems, the former name of Veritas Software
 Tolerance tax, a historic tax that was levied against Jews in Hungary

Life sciences
 Desiccation tolerance, the ability of an organism to endure extreme dryness
 Drug tolerance or physiological tolerance, a decrease in the response to a substance due to previous exposure
 Alcohol tolerance
 Multidrug tolerance or antibiotic tolerance, the ability of a disease-causing microorganism to resist killing by antimicrobials
 Immune tolerance or immunological tolerance, by which the immune system does not attack an antigen
 Central tolerance, a mechanism by which newly developing T cells and B cells are rendered non-reactive to self
 Immune tolerance in pregnancy or gestational/maternal immune tolerance
 Low frustration tolerance, a concept in Rational Emotive Behavioral Therapy
 Pain tolerance, the maximum level of pain that a person is able to tolerate
 Shade tolerance, a plant's abilities to tolerate low light levels
 Disease tolerance or tolerance to infection - one of the mechanisms host organisms can use to fight against parasites, pathogens or herbivores that attack the host.frustration

Physical sciences
 Engineering tolerance, permissible limit(s) of variation in an object
 Tolerance analysis, the study of accumulated variation in mechanical parts and assemblies
 Tolerance coning, a budget of all tolerances that affect a particular parameter
 Tolerance, a measure of multicollinearity in statistics
 Tolerance interval, a type of statistical probability
 Tolerance relation, a reflexive and symmetric binary relation in mathematics
 Tolerant sequence, in mathematical logic

Other uses
 Paradox of tolerance, a paradox described by Karl Popper stating that if a society is tolerant without limit, its ability to be tolerant is eventually seized or destroyed by the intolerant
 Tolerance Monument, an outdoor sculpture near Goldman Promenade in Jerusalem
 Tolerance (film), a 2000 Brazilian drama film
 Tolerance (sculpture), a 2011 sculpture by Jaume Plensa

See also
 Intolerance (disambiguation)
 Ontario Consultants on Religious Tolerance
 Toleration Act (disambiguation)
 Zero tolerance (disambiguation)